Daniel Lind Lagerlöf (6 February 1969 – missing since 6 October 2011) is a Swedish director, screenwriter and producer who is presumed dead.

Career 
Lagerlöf began his work in television as an assistant, and directed his first film, Föreställningen (The Performance) in 1990. In 1997, he began working on Skärgårdsdoktorn, a highly successful drama series in Sweden and Norway. After it ended in 2000, Lagerlöf worked on several Beck-films, before returning to television. His last completed project was the three-part mini-series Bibliotekstjuven (the Library Thief), written by his wife Malin Lagerlöf.

Personal life 
Lagerlöf married his long-time girlfriend Malin Lagerlöf in 1997. They had three children together. A screenwriter, Malin Lagerlöf often wrote projects for her husband to direct, including his final series, Bibliotekstjuven.

Disappearance 
On 6 October 2011, Lagerlöf disappeared during preparations for the filming of Camilla Läckberg's Fjällbackamorden - Strandriddaren while scouting a planned filming location in the Tjurpannan nature reserve, leaving a wife and three children.

It is believed Lagerlöf was caught on slippery rocks by large waves sweeping the area and pulled out to sea near the steep cliffs outside Tanumshede in Bohuslän. There were no witnesses to what actually happened. , no remains have been found, and Lagerlöf is presumed deceased.

Selected filmography
 1999 – Breaking out (Vägen ut)
 2001 – Making Babies (Hans och hennes)
 2002 – Beck – Annonsmannen
 2002 – Beck – Pojken i glaskulan
 2003 – Miffo
 2005 - Buss till Italien
 2005 - Medicinmannen
 2006 - Svalan, katten, rosen, döden
 2007 - The Pyramid
 2009 - The Man Under the Stairs (TV-series)
 2009 - Johan Falk: Operation Nightingale

See also
List of people who disappeared

References

External links

1969 births
2010s missing person cases
Swedish male screenwriters
Missing people
Missing person cases in Sweden
People declared dead in absentia
Swedish film directors
Swedish film producers
Swedish screenwriters
Writers from Stockholm